Milden Castle was a motte-and-bailey castle on Foxburrow hill in Milden, a village in Suffolk, England.

It was built in the 12th century, but today all that remains is the earth mound upon which it was constructed. The mound is a scheduled monument.

References

External links
Brief details

Castles in Suffolk
Babergh District